For 2000 AD is the fourth studio album from rock singer Kim Kyung Ho, released on Samsung Music in 1999. The song "1052" is said to be meaning "love". 1 looks similar to L, and 0 to O. 5 is V in Roman numbering system. And 2 sounds like "E" in Korean, so 1052 means LOVE.

Track listing

 For 2000 AD 
 Through It Away! (버려!) 
 Inerasable Trace (화인)
 Love Sadder than the Separation (이별보다 슬픈 사랑)
 1052  
 Non-Stop 
 When My Love Calls You (내 그리움 널 부를 때)
 Love That We Can Never Achieve (이룰 수 없는 사랑)
 Come To Me (내게로 와)
 Heartlessness (비정)
 Rock 'N Roll 
 Till I Beautifully Love You (To You ; Forbidden Love II) (아름답게 사랑하는 날까지 (To You ; 금지된 사랑 II))

1999 albums
Kim Kyung-ho albums